All Things New is the twelfth studio album by Steven Curtis Chapman. It was released on September 9, 2004, by Sparrow Records.

In 2005, the album won the Grammy Award for Best Pop/Contemporary Gospel Album; unusually for Chapman, however, the album did not win the corresponding Dove Award that year (2005), although it had been nominated.

The "All Thing New" concert tour in support of this album included Casting Crowns and the worship leader Chris Tomlin.

Track listing

Personnel 

 Steven Curtis Chapman – lead vocals, backing vocals (1, 3–9, 11), acoustic guitar (1, 2, 3, 5–8, 11, 12), electric guitar (1, 4, 9), acoustic piano (1, 4, 7, 10, 12), dobro (3), mandolin (3), 12-string acoustic guitar (4, 9), bouzouki (7), synthesizer (7), Leslie pedal (8)
 Lyle Workman – electric guitar (1–11)
 George Cocchini – electric guitar (1, 2, 4, 6–9)
 Jonny Lang – electric guitar solo (3), backing vocals (3)
 Patrick Warren – keyboards (1, 4, 5, 6, 8, 10, 11), Chamberlin (4, 9), acoustic piano (5), additional keyboards (7), string arrangements
 Dan Needham – programming (3, 7, 8)
 Chris Chaney – bass (1–11)
 Matt Chamberlain – drums (1–11), loops (3)
 Ric Robbins – DJ (3)
 Jason Wade – backing vocals (1)
 Pierre Haxaire – spoken intro (7)
 Mac Powell – backing vocals (9)
 Kendall Payne – backing vocals (11) 

Strings (2, 10, 12)

 Larry Corbett – cello
 Susie Katayama – cello
 Steve Richards – cello
 Dan Smith – cello
 Reggie Hamilton – string bass
 Ian Walker – string bass
 Bob Becker – viola
 Denyse Buffum – viola
 Matt Funes – viola
 Karie Prescott – viola
 Charles Bisharat – violin
 Mario DeLeon – violin
 Joel Derouin – violin
 Armen Garabedian – violin
 Berg Garabedian – violin
 Peter Kent – violin
 Natalie Legget – violin
 Michelle Richards – violin

Production

 Brown Bannister – producer
 Steven Curtis Chapman – producer
 Dan Raines – executive producer
 Peter York – executive producer
 Trina Shoemaker – recording engineer
 Steve Bishir – recording engineer
 Ryan Castle – recording engineer, digital editing
 Danny Duncan – recording engineer, digital editing 
 Jed Hackett – digital editing
 Bill Whittington – digital editing
 Sunset Sound, Los Angeles – recording location
 Oxford Sound, Nashville, Tennessee – recording location
 The Tracking Room, Nashville, Tennessee – recording location
 Jess Sutcliffe – string recording engineer at Henson Studios, Los Angeles
 Glenn Pittman – assistant string recording engineer
 Jamie Sickora – assistant string recording engineer
 Chris Lord-Alge – mixing (1, 2, 5, 9, 10, 12) at Image Recording Studios, Los Angeles
 Jack Joseph Puig – mixing (3, 4, 6, 7, 8, 11) at Ocean Way Recording, Los Angeles
 Bob Ludwig – mastering at Gateway Mastering, Portland, Maine.
 Shari Sutcliffe – production coordinator, for Belgravia Music, Los Angeles
 Ken Johnson – production coordinator, for Production Services, Nashville
 Jan Cook – creative direction
 Gravillis, Inc. – art direction and design
 Kwaku Alston – photography
 David Kaufman – stylist
 Tracy Moyer – grooming

Notes 

2004 albums
Steven Curtis Chapman albums
Grammy Award for Best Pop/Contemporary Gospel Album